A battery pack is a set of any number of (preferably) identical batteries or individual battery cells. They may be configured in a series, parallel or a mixture of both to deliver the desired voltage, capacity, or power density. The term battery pack is often used in reference to cordless tools, radio-controlled hobby toys, and battery electric vehicles.

Components of battery packs include the individual batteries or cells, and the interconnects which provide electrical conductivity between them.  Rechargeable battery packs often contain a temperature sensor, which the battery charger uses to detect the end of charging.  Interconnects are also found in batteries as they are the part which connects each cell, though batteries are most often only arranged in series strings.

When a pack contains groups of cells in parallel there are differing wiring configurations which take into consideration the electrical balance of the circuit. Battery regulators are sometimes used to keep the voltage of each individual cell below its maximum value during charging so as to allow the weaker batteries to become fully charged, bringing the whole pack back into balance. Active balancing can also be performed by battery balancer devices which can shuttle energy from strong cells to weaker ones in real time for better balance.  A well-balanced pack lasts longer and delivers better performance.

For an inline package, cells are selected and stacked with solder in between them. The cells are pressed together and a current pulse generates  heat to solder them together and to weld all connections internal to the cell.

Calculating state of charge
SOC, or state of charge, is the equivalent of a fuel gauge for a battery.  SOC cannot be determined by a simple voltage measurement, because the terminal voltage of a battery may stay substantially constant until it is completely discharged.  In some types of battery, electrolyte specific gravity may be related to state of charge but this is not measurable on typical battery pack cells, and is not related to state of charge on most battery types.  Most SOC methods take into account voltage and current as well as temperature and other aspects of the discharge and charge process to in essence count up or down within a pre-defined capacity of a pack.  More complex state of charge estimation systems take into account the Peukert effect which relates the capacity of the battery to the discharge rate.

Advantages
An advantage of a battery pack is the ease with which it can be swapped into or out of a device. This allows multiple packs to deliver extended runtimes, freeing up the device for continued use while charging the removed pack separately.

Another advantage is the flexibility of their design and implementation, allowing the use of cheaper high-production cells or batteries to be combined into a pack for nearly any application.

At the end of product life, batteries can be removed and recycled separately, reducing the total volume of hazardous waste.

Disadvantages
Packs are often simpler for end users to repair or tamper with than a sealed non-serviceable battery or cell.  Though some might consider this an advantage it is important to take safety precautions when servicing a battery pack as they pose a danger as potential chemical, electrical, and fire risks.

See also
Battery balancer
Battery charger
Battery Management System (BMS)
Battery monitoring
Battery regulator
 List of battery types
Smart Battery Data

References

Automotive electrics
Battery types